959 may refer to:

Years and Numbers
959, year (AD)
959 BC, year
959 (number)

Automobiles
Porsche 959, sports car (in production 1986–1993)
Ducati 959, motorcycle (currently in production)

See also

 List of highways numbered 959